

About  
TV8 is a Lithuanian terrestrial, satellite and cable television channel aimed at women, owned by TV3 Grupė . It was launched on 3 October 2011. On the air: programs, series, lifestyle shows. TV8 shows mostly Lithuanian productions but also shows Turkish, German, Indian, Mexican and etc.

TV8, as with other channels of the Media Baltics group in the Baltic States, switched to HD broadcasting on 26 July 2018.

Programs  
 Ambasadoriaus Dukra (Turkish drama series) - Sefirin Kizi 
 Palikimas (Turkish drama series) - Emanet
 Sveikas Rytojus (Lithuanian lifestyle program)
 Moterų Paslaptys (Russian melodrama series)-Женские секреты
 Na Palauk (Russian-soviet animation program) - Ну, погоди (shown on the show (lit. Labanakt, Vaikučiai) 
 La Maistas (Lithuanian food program)
 TV Pagalba (Lithuanian Program about people's problems) 
 Pasaulis Pagal moteris(Lithuanian program for women)
 Partneriai (French detective) - Tandem
 Moterys meluoja geriau (Lithuanian soap/drama series)
 Audringi Laikai (German Film) - Inga Lindström - Wilde Zeiten
 Moterys meluoja geriau. Robertėlis. Filmas (Lithuanian)

References

External links 

 

Television channels in Lithuania
TV8 Lithuania
2011 establishments in Lithuania
Television channels and stations established in 2011